Amit Pawar was an Indian film editor, most known for the films, Main Madhuri Dixit Banna Chahti Hoon, Dombivali Fast, and Mumbai Meri Jaan. He won the Filmfare Award for Best Editing for Mumbai Meri Jaan in 2009.

Filmography
 2003 - Main Madhuri Dixit Banna Chahti Hoon (Hindi)
 2004 - Supari (Marathi]]
 2005 - Dombivali Fast (Marathi)
 2005 - Yanda Kartavya Aahe (Marathi)
 2006 - Majha Navra Tujhi Bayako
 2007 - Evano Oruvan (Tamil)
 2007 - Saade Maade Teen (Marathi)
 2008 - Mumbai Meri Jaan (Hindi)
 2009 - Hangama (Marathi)
 2009 - Harishchandrachi Factory (Marathi)
 2010 - Ringa Ringa (Marathi)
 2010 - Kshanbhar Vishranti Amit Pawar

External links
 

Hindi film editors
1972 births
2010 deaths
Artists from Mumbai
Marathi film editors
Film editors from Maharashtra